Janusz R. Wojtusiak (February 21, 1942 – May 2, 2012) was a Polish entomologist and son of the well-known Polish biologist, Roman Wojtusiak, Professor at the Jagiellonian University.

He presented his Ph.D. thesis in 1971. It concerned the morphology of the family Adelidae.

In 1994, he received a professorial nomination from the President of the Republic of Poland, Lech Wałęsa.

Janusz Wojtusiak's son, also Janusz Wojtusiak, is a computer scientist and a faculty member at George Mason University in Virginia.

References

External links
 pte.up.poznan.pl

1942 births
2012 deaths
Jagiellonian University alumni
Polish expatriates in Nigeria
Polish entomologists
Scientists from Kraków
Academic staff of the University of Nigeria